Thomas Timothy Garfield Morgan (19 April 1931 – 5 December 2009) was an English actor who appeared mostly on television and occasionally in films.

Biography

Born in Birmingham, Warwickshire, Morgan began acting with a youth club drama group in Erdington where he grew up. He apprenticed as a dental mechanic before enrolling into drama school.  He started his acting career with the Arena Theatre, Birmingham. He then went on to be Director of Productions at the Marlowe Theatre, Canterbury from 1957 to 1958 and then at Manchester's Library Theatre 1959 to 1960. He was associate director of the Northcott Theatre 1976 to 1978 and associate director of the Nottingham Playhouse in 1978.

Entering TV in 1955, he made hundreds of appearances in many shows. He played Detective Chief Inspector Gwyn Lewis in the first series of the BBC police series Softly, Softly, but his best remembered role was as Detective Chief Inspector Frank Haskins in the Euston Films/Thames Television's British crime series of the 1970s, The Sweeney. Morgan appeared in all four series of the programme. He appeared in "The House on Haunted Hill" episode of Randall and Hopkirk (Deceased) in 1969. He continued to perform in character roles on TV, most recently in The Bill. He appeared on Hallelujah!, No Job for a Lady and Shelley. His film roles included The Odessa File and 28 Weeks Later.

He appeared on Z-Cars, Dear Mother...Love Albert, The Bill, The Likely Lads, Dr. Finlay's Casebook, No Hiding Place, Callan, Redcap, Paul Temple, The Persuaders!, The Avengers, On the Buses, Dixon of Dock Green, Special Branch, Sutherland's Law, George and Mildred, The Gentle Touch, Lovejoy, Bad Girls, Heartbeat, Crown Court, The Saint, Minder, Shelley, Public Eye, The Troubleshooters, Dangerfield and Holby City.

Personal life
He was married to the actress Dilys Laye in 1963 (marriage dissolved). He listed his hobbies as golf, photography and riding (show-jumping and eventing). Morgan died from cancer on 5 December 2009.

Filmography
 The Intimate Stranger (1956) - Waiter (uncredited)
 Der Schwur des Soldaten Pooley (1961) - Albert Pooley
 A Prize of Arms (1962) - MP with Dog
 Two Letter Alibi (1962) - Foreman of the Jury (uncredited)
 On the Run (1963) - Meredith
 The Undesirable Neighbour (1963), part of The Scales of Justice series of featurettes - Mr. Andrews (a barrister)
 The Informers (1963) - 2nd Inspector (uncredited)
 Company of Fools (1966), part of The Scales of Justice series of featurettes - Jason (a dishonest businessman)
 Our Mother's House (1967) - Mr. Moley
 Perfect Friday (1970) - 1st Airport Official
 To Catch a Spy (1971) - The Husband
 Bel Ami (1971) - Jacques Rivat
 Henry VIII and His Six Wives (1972) - Gardiner
 Digby, the Biggest Dog in the World (1973) - Rogerson
 The Odessa File (1974) - Israeli General
 George and Mildred (1980) - Jim Bridges
 Murder Elite (1985) - Inspector Moss
 Out of Order (1987) - Drill Sergeant
 The Englishman Who Went Up a Hill But Came Down a Mountain (1995) - Davies the School
 Starting Over (1998) - Morgan
 Top Dog (2002) - Bob Henchard
 28 Weeks Later (2007) - Geoff (final film role)

References

External links

Obituary in The Independent

1931 births
2009 deaths
People from Erdington
Deaths from cancer in England
English male stage actors
English male film actors
English male television actors
People from Birmingham, West Midlands
Male actors from Birmingham, West Midlands